Colonel (Later Brigadier General) Salihu Tunde Bello was Administrator of Kebbi State in Nigeria from December 1993 to August 1996 during the military regime of General Sani Abacha.
During his administration he achieved significant development of the state infrastructure. 
In July 1999, after the return to democracy, all armed forces officers that had served in military governments for six months or more were forced to retire.
Brigadier-General Salihu Bello was among those affected by this decision.

Membership of professional body
In 2009 Salihu Bello was a member of the board of the Cocoa Research Institute of Nigeria (CRIN).

References

Nigerian generals
Living people
Yoruba military personnel
Governors of Kebbi State
Year of birth missing (living people)